Billy Blazes, Esq. is a 1919 American short comedy film featuring Harold Lloyd. The film was a parody of Westerns of the time. A print of the film survives in the film archive of the British Film Institute.

Cast
 Harold Lloyd as Billy Blazes
 Bebe Daniels as Nell
 Snub Pollard as Sheriff 'Gun Shy' Gallagher (as Harry Pollard)
 Sammy Brooks
 Billy Fay
 Noah Young (uncredited)

Plot
In the misnamed western hamlet of Peaceful Vale, where gun play is commonplace, there has not been a murder in 20 minutes.  The father and daughter co-proprietors of a local saloon are harassed by the leader of a violent mob who attempts to run the father out of the country while holding his pretty daughter, Nell, hostage.  Heroic Billy Blazes arrives in time to free the father, rescue Nell, and escape with her to safety.  The film's final scene, set "three years later", shows Nell and Billy as the parents of a large and happy family, whose children are clearly more than three years old.

Although the film is only 13 minutes long, the title character does not appear until five minutes into film.

See also
 List of American films of 1919
 Harold Lloyd filmography

References

External links

1919 films
1919 comedy films
1919 short films
American silent short films
American black-and-white films
Films directed by Hal Roach
Silent American comedy films
Films with screenplays by H. M. Walker
American comedy short films
1910s American films